Lorenzo Branchetti (born 14 January 1981) is an Italian character actor, presenter, and entertainer perhaps best known for his role in the television program Melevisione on Raitre (as Milo Cotogno).

Filmography

Television

Films

References 

Italian male film actors
Italian television personalities
Italian male television actors
People from Prato
1981 births
Living people